Abdul Baset al-Sarout (1 January 1992 – 8 June 2019) was a Syrian association football goalkeeper. He represented his country at the Syria U17 and Syria U20 level. He was also a prominent rebel figure in the Syrian Revolution.

Biography

Abdul Baset was born to a Bedouin family in Al-Bayadah, Homs. Prior to the Syrian revolution, he was a soccer goalkeeper for both Al-Karamah SC and the Syrian national team. When the uprising started, he led demonstrations in his hometown of Homs, where for a period of time he hosted the actress Fadwa Soliman, with whom he held rallies demanding the removal of Syrian President Bashar al-Assad, as well as other general demands of the Syrian uprising. As violence erupted between pro and antigovernmental groups, all four of his brothers were killed by Syrian security forces. His uncle, Mohiey Edden al-Sarout, was killed in November 2011 in Homs. He became well known for his chants during anti-government demonstrations. Initially, his speeches and chants were mostly nationalist in nature, but in line with the rising influence of Islamism among Syrian rebel groups, they gradually adopted more overtly religious and sectarian undertones. During the Siege of Homs from 2011 to 2014, he became a Syrian rebel commander.

Arab-speaking media networks like Al Jazeera and Al Araby described him as a "well known icon in the Syrian uprising", as well as by the epithet "Keeper of the Revolution", a wordplay on him being an ex-goalkeeper. After the disintegration of the Free Syrian Army, he became a commander in the rebel group Jaysh al-Izza.

Sarout survived at least three assassination attempts during his time as a rebel commander. During one attempt, 50 fighters from his unit, the Bayada Martyrs' Brigade, were killed. He was featured in the 2013 war documentary The Return to Homs.

In 2014, he was among the rebels evacuated from Homs to the rebel-held Idlib Governorate by the Syrian government, following the surrender deal that ended the Siege of Homs.

In November 2015, Sarout and the Bayada Martyrs' Brigade came into conflict with the Al-Nusra Front. The Al-Nusra forces attacked Sarout and his fighters over a claim that Sarout had pledged allegiance to the Islamic State of Iraq and the Levant. Sarout denied the claim, but admitted he had considered joining ISIL, as he started viewing the jihadist group as the only force capable of fighting the Syrian Government. He stated that he gave up on joining the group after realizing that it was primarily concerned with setting up a caliphate, rather than fighting the government. He added that while he didn't join the militant group, he would also refuse to fight against it.

On 29 May 2017, Sarout was arrested by Tahrir al-Sham after being accused of participating in an anti-HTS protest in Maarat al-Nu'man. He was released on 24 June and charges against him were dropped.

Death

He died on 8 June 2019, during the 2019 Northwestern Syria offensive, after engaging in combat with the Syrian Army at Tal Malah village. According to a Jayish al-Izza spokesperson, as well as the pro-opposition Syrian Observatory for Human Rights, he died in a Turkish hospital in Reyhanlı, Hatay from wounds sustained two days prior, when he was struck by Syrian Army artillery, after his unit clashed with the army in northern Hama. He was taken a day later to the village of Al-Dana in rebel-held northwestern Syria, to be buried with one of his deceased brothers.

References

External links
Syrian Revolution Icon, Activist Abdelbaset Sarout – Documentary film (with English Subtitles)

1992 births
2019 deaths
Association football goalkeepers
Syrian dissidents
Al-Karamah players
Members of the Free Syrian Army
Syrian footballers
People killed in the Syrian civil war
Salafi jihadists